Samantha Crawford and Madison Keys were the defending champions, having won the event in 2012, but both players chose not to defend their title. Jan Abaza and Allie Will won the title, defeating Naomi Broady and Irina Falconi in the final, 7–5, 3–6, [10–3].

Seeds

Draw

References 
 Draw

Yakima Regional Hospital Challenger - Doubles